Jean Cochard (born 27 March 1939) is a French athlete. He competed in the men's long jump at the 1964 Summer Olympics and the 1968 Summer Olympics.

References

External links
 

1939 births
Living people
Athletes (track and field) at the 1964 Summer Olympics
Athletes (track and field) at the 1968 Summer Olympics
French male long jumpers
Olympic athletes of France
Place of birth missing (living people)
Mediterranean Games silver medalists for France
Mediterranean Games medalists in athletics
Athletes (track and field) at the 1963 Mediterranean Games
20th-century French people
21st-century French people